Yuxarı Mərcanlı (also, Yukhary Marjanly and Mirzanagly and Mirzanagyly) is a village in the Jabrayil Rayon of Azerbaijan.

References

See also
Böyük Mərcanlı
Çocuq Mərcanlı 

Populated places in Jabrayil District